Qingbei may refer to:
Qingbei, township in Jiaohe, Jilin, China
Qingbei, village in Tanshi, Xiangxiang, Xiangtan, Hunan, China
"Qīngbēi", 2018 single by Chinese girl group Super Impassioned Net Generation

See also
Qinbei District, Qinzhou, Guangxi, China
Qingbai ware, a type of Chinese porcelain
Chengbei (disambiguation)